Georg Friedrich Karl Koppmann (24 March 1839, Hamburg – 25 March 1905, Rostock) was a German historian, archivist and an authority in the field of German municipal history, particularly in the Hanseatic League.

1839 births
1905 deaths
19th-century German historians
Writers from Hamburg